Shadalafiya (Nkui) is a town in Kagarko Local Government Area of southern Kaduna State, Nigeria. The Shadalafiya people speak the Koro Wachi language.

References

Populated places in Kaduna State